The Kara-Suu or  is a right tributary of the Naryn in Aksy District, Jalal-Abad Region, Kyrgyzstan. The river source is in the Chatkal Range, western Tian Shan mountains. It flows through the villages Chaldybar and Jangy-Jol. The river discharges into the Naryn north of Tash-Kömür. Kara-Suu's peak flow is in May, and the minimum flow - in January. The main tributaries are Ak-Jol, Turduk, Avletim, and Kojata.

References

Rivers of Kyrgyzstan